Navitas Petroleum is a publicly traded, North America-focused, oil and natural Gas Exploration and production company. Navitas is traded on the Tel Aviv Stock Exchange (TICKER: NVPT.L) and has offices in Houston, Texas and in Herzliya, Israel.

Key Persons 
Gideon Tadmor co-founded Navitas and acts as the partnership's executive chairman. Tadmor had previously served in a variety of leading roles, including as chairman of Delek Drilling Limited Partnership as well as founder and chairman of Avner Oil and Gas LP. Tadmor has been one of the pioneers of the major natural gas discoveries, such as the Tamar and Leviathan natural gas fields, off the coast of Israel and Cyprus. He has been working together with his team in the exploration, development, and production of oil and gas assets for more than 30 years.  Other founding partners at Navitas include: the CEO, Chanan Reichman, who previously served as Delek Energy's VP of business development; the deputy chairman, Koby Katz, who previously served as the director general of the Israeli Ministry of National Infrastructure, Energy, and Water as well as the co-CEO of Delek Energy and chairman of Delek Drilling;  and the deputy CEO, Chanan Wolf, who previously served as head of M&A and capital markets at Ernst & Young.

History 
Navitas Petroleum began trading on the Tel Aviv Stock Exchange in October 2017. Since then, the partnership has focused on acquiring proven O&G discoveries at various stages of development. Since its inception, Navitas has raised over NIS 1 billion of equity and debt in public markets. As of December 2018, Navitas' asset portfolio comprises 14 O&G assets, including exploration acreage and proven discoveries in Eastern Canada and in the United States' territorial waters in the Gulf of Mexico.

Operations 
Navitas' main assets include the Buckskin and Shenandoah major oil discoveries in the Gulf of Mexico off the coast of the United States as well as Block 7 off the coast of Newfoundland and Labrador in East Canada. Navitas' JV partners include LLOG Exploration, Repsol, Equinor (formerly Statoil), Delek Group, Blackstone, Warburg Pincus, and Riverstone portfolio companies.

References 

Energy companies established in 2015
Companies listed on the Tel Aviv Stock Exchange
Oil and gas companies of Israel
Companies based in Herzliya
Israeli companies established in 2015